March 18 - Eastern Orthodox liturgical calendar - March 20

All fixed commemorations below are observed on April 1 by Orthodox Churches on the Old Calendar.

For March 19th, Orthodox Churches on the Old Calendar commemorate the Saints listed on March 6.

Saints

 Martyrs Chrysanthus and Daria, and those with them in Rome (283):
 Claudius the Tribune, his wife Hilaria, their sons Jason and Maurus, the priest Diodorus, and the deacon Marianus.
 Martyr Pancharius at Nicomedia (302)

Pre-Schism Western saints

 Saints Quintus, Quintilla, Quartilla, Mark and Companions, martyrs venerated in Sorrento near Naples in Italy.
 Saints Apollonius and Leontius (Leontinus), by tradition early Bishops of Braga in Portugal (4th century)
 Saint Auxilius, a companion of St Patrick, became Bishop of Killossey (near Naas, County Kildare) in Ireland (c. 460)
 Saint John the Syrian of Pinna, a Syrian monk who settled in Pinna near Spoleto in Italy, became abbot of a large monastic colony there for forty-four years (6th century).
 Saint Leontius of Saintes, Bishop of Saintes (640)
 Saints Landoald and Amantius, a priest and deacon who helped enlighten what is now Belgium and north-eastern France, founded the church at Wintershoven (c. 668)
 Saint Adrian, disciple of St Landoald, murdered while begging alms for his monastery near Maastricht in the Netherlands (c. 668)
 Saint Lactan, born near Cork in Ireland, St Comgall entrusted him to found a monastery at Achadh-Ur, now Freshford, in Kilkenny (672)
 Saint Alcmund (Alchmund of Derby, or of Lilleshall), martyred in Shropshire (c. 800)
 Saint Gemus, a monk, probably at Moyenmoutier in Alsace, now in France, his relics were enshrined at Hürbach.

Post-Schism Orthodox saints

 Righteous Mary (Maria Shvarnovna), wife of Vsevelod III (1206)
 Saint Bassa, nun, of the Pskov-Caves Monastery (1473)
 Venerable Innocent of Komel the Wonderworker, in Vologda (1521), disciple of St. Nilus of Sora.
 New Martyr Demetrius, at Constantinople (1564)
 Saint Sophia of Slutsk and Minsk, descendant of the Sovereigns of the Kyivan-Rus' (1612)
 New Martyr Nicholas Karamanos of Smyrna (1657)
 Saint Symeon (Popovic), Archimandrite of Dajbabe Monastery, Montenegro (1941)

New martyrs and confessors

 Saint John Blinov, Confessor (1932)
 New Martyr Matrona Alexeeva (1938)

Other commemorations

 Smolensk "Umileniye" ("Tender Feeling") Icon of the Most Holy Theotokos.
 Icon of the Mother of God of Lubyatov (15th century)

Gallery

Notes

References

Sources
 March 19/April 1. Orthodox Calendar (PRAVOSLAVIE.RU).
 April 1 / March 19. HOLY TRINITY RUSSIAN ORTHODOX CHURCH (A parish of the Patriarchate of Moscow).
 March 19. OCA - The Lives of the Saints.
 The Autonomous Orthodox Metropolia of Western Europe and the Americas (ROCOR). St. Hilarion Calendar of Saints for the year of our Lord 2004. St. Hilarion Press (Austin, TX). pp. 22-23.
 March 19. Latin Saints of the Orthodox Patriarchate of Rome.
 Rev. Richard Stanton. A Menology of England and Wales, or, Brief Memorials of the Ancient British and English Saints Arranged According to the Calendar, Together with the Martyrs of the 16th and 17th Centuries. London: Burns & Oates, 1892. pp. 124-125.
 The Roman Martyrology. Transl. by the Archbishop of Baltimore. Last Edition, According to the Copy Printed at Rome in 1914. Revised Edition, with the Imprimatur of His Eminence Cardinal Gibbons. Baltimore: John Murphy Company, 1916. pp. 80-81.
Greek Sources
 Great Synaxaristes:  19 ΜΑΡΤΙΟΥ. ΜΕΓΑΣ ΣΥΝΑΞΑΡΙΣΤΗΣ.
  Συναξαριστής. 19 Μαρτίου. ECCLESIA.GR. (H ΕΚΚΛΗΣΙΑ ΤΗΣ ΕΛΛΑΔΟΣ).
Russian Sources
  1 апреля (19 марта). Православная Энциклопедия под редакцией Патриарха Московского и всея Руси Кирилла (электронная версия). (Orthodox Encyclopedia - Pravenc.ru).
  19 марта (ст.ст.) 1 апреля 2013 (нов. ст.). Русская Православная Церковь Отдел внешних церковных связей. (DECR).

March in the Eastern Orthodox calendar